The Campaign is the second full-length album by American metal band Affiance. The album was relatively well received. Vocalist Dennis Tvrdik stated, "The vast majority of people like it. It rubbed some people the wrong way and to be honest, I’m glad it did. I don’t expect every person to agree with us or be our fan. There are a lot of people out there I don’t want at our shows because they are a part of the problem with the music scene. We want to be part of the solution."
Videos were made on Kings of Deceit, The Cynic and We The Machines.

Track listing

Personnel
Affiance
Patrick Galante − drums
Dominic Dickinson − lead guitar
Brett Wondrak − rhythm guitar
Cameron Keeter − bass guitar
Dennis Tvrdik − vocals

Production
Produced and mixed by Carson Slovak and Grant McFarland
Engineered by Carson Slovak and Grant McFarland
Recorded at Atrium Audio
Mastered by Carson Slovak
Art direction and design by Travis Roberts
Band photography by John Stanchina

References 

2012 albums
Affiance (band) albums